Couroupita nicaraguarensis (the epithet often spelled as nicaraguensis), the bala de cañón, coco de mono, paraíso, zapote de mico, or zapote de mono, is a species of woody plant in the family Lecythidaceae. It is found in Colombia, Costa Rica, Ecuador, El Salvador, Nicaragua, Puerto Rico and Panama. It is threatened by habitat loss. In Puerto Rico, the only place it is found at is Toa Alta, Puerto Rico.

References

Lecythidaceae
Neotropical realm flora
Near threatened plants
Plants described in 1828
Taxa named by Augustin Pyramus de Candolle
Flora of Colombia
Flora of Costa Rica
Flora of Ecuador
Flora of El Salvador
Flora of Nicaragua
Flora of Puerto Rico
Taxonomy articles created by Polbot